Ahlamu or Aḫlamū, were a group or designation of Semitic semi-nomads. Their habitat was west of the Euphrates, between the mouth of the Khabur and Palmyra.

In the 18th century BC, they were first mentioned in the sources since Rim-Anum, a king of Uruk, and in texts from Mari; then, in the 14th century BC in Egyptian sources, in one of the Amarna letters, in the days of Akhenaten, where it is affirmed that they had advanced until the Euphrates.

Etymology
Although the etymology and meaning is ultimately uncertain, it can safely be said to derive from the Semitic language family. In the past it was proposed as "companion or confederate" by an error of scholar Wayne T. Pitard, comparing it to an unrelated Arabic root, presumably  ح ل ف (ḥ-l-f), which does indeed mean such. The more recent proposal by Lipiński, connects it instead to غ ل م (ḡ-l-m) denoting a boy, lad, post-pubescent youth, a young man, a man full of virility or prowess, the prime of his life, full of testosterone, wild or lusty. The sense of puberty and hitting sexual as well physical maturity can be found as well in the variant ح ل م (ḥ-l-m). He further compares the word form as a broken plural pattern found common in Arabic; bands of wild young men.

There is also a scholarly debate as to whether this term is a proper name of a group or rather a designation of a type of group. The significance of this comes in identifying possible genealogical backgrounds and connections of some groups given this appellation, such as the Arameans and even some tribes that had elsewhere been called Amorites. It would imply either sub-tribes of an overarching "Aḫlamite" people or rather as separate distinct peoples identified as such by a similar lifestyle. This would be a nomadic designation of the roaming raiding forces that made forays and razzias to capture flocks, slaves, and food supplies from the desert regions South and West of Mesopotamia.

History
In part, these Ahlamu certainly meant the Amorites. One of the tribes of the Ahlamu were the Arameans, they often acted together with the Suteans. Raids of the Ahlamu are also performed in the Persian Gulf in that they may have disrupted or interrupted trading in Dilmun.

In one of his inscriptions, the Assyrian king Adad-nirari II states that his father, Ashur-dan II, defeated different peoples of the mountains including Ahlamu nomads. According to the inscription of another Assyrian king, Shalmaneser I, the Ahlamu with the Mitannian support of Shattuara II of Hanigalbat, were defeated in their uprising against the Assyrians.

Ahlamu were even able to obstruct communication between kingdoms, mentioned by king of Babylon Kadashman-Enlil II, in his relations with the Hittite king Ḫattušili III, in which he complains about the interruption of sending messengers between the two courts, under the pretext of the assaults of Ahlamu bandit. From the 12th century B.C.E. onward, the Mesopotamians increasingly referred to these same mobile groups as "Arameans."

They are also known as enemies of the Assyrians, when Assyria resurfaces again, already in the time of the monarch Ashur-resh-ishi I, he alluded to victories over the Ahlamu, and Gutians, so did his successor, Tiglath-Pileser I.

The Assyrian king, Arik-den-ili, turned westward into the Levant (modern Syria and Lebanon), where he managed to subjugate the Suteans, the Ahlamu and the Yauru, in the region of Katmuḫi in the middle Euphrates.

Social life
Ahlamu could fight on their own as they acted as mercenaries with other peoples like the Hittites or the Mitannis. For instance, the Suteans, a prominent Ahlamu group, were prized as capable and fierce warriors, and were featured in the Ugaritic texts as such. In addition, because of their excellent knowledge of the Syrian desert steppes, they were sometimes hired as caravan guides or drovers, the same as the nomads Suteans for large commercial expeditions.

Moreover, they lived in tents, under the jurisdiction of a sheikh, Rab Zārāti, lord of the tent camp. In the Kassitic Nippur, they served as guards. Some of them had Kassitic or Babylonian names, although history says that they were not always reliable.

See also
 Habiru
 Shasu
 Shutu
 Suteans

References

2nd millennium BC
Canaan
Ancient peoples of the Near East